Karen Lynn Roberts (born 10 June 1967 in Cape Town, Western Cape) is a retired female field hockey player from South Africa, who represented her native country at the 2000 Summer Olympics in Sydney, Australia. There she captained the women's national team that finished in tenth place.

References

External links

1967 births
Living people
South African female field hockey players
Olympic field hockey players of South Africa
Field hockey players at the 1998 Commonwealth Games
Field hockey players at the 2000 Summer Olympics
Sportspeople from Cape Town
Commonwealth Games competitors for South Africa